Päivälehti was a newspaper in Finland, which was then a Grand Duchy under the Czar of Russia. The paper was founded in 1889 as the organ of the Young Finnish Party and was published on six days a week. The founding company of the paper was Sanoma which also started its activities in the same year. The founder of the paper was the Finnish journalist Eero Erkko who also served as its editor-in-chief.

Political censorship by the Russian authorities, prompted by the paper's strong advocacy of greater Finnish freedoms and even outright independence, forced Päivälehti to often temporarily suspend publication. In June 1904, a week after Governor-General Nikolai Ivanovich Bobrikov was assassinated by Eugen Schauman, Päivälehti published an editorial about how at the time of mid-summer, the light wins against the darkness after all. As a consequence of this, the paper was closed permanently the same year.

In its place, the owners founded the newspaper Helsingin Sanomat, only four days after the last issue of Päivälehti.

References

External links 
 History of Päivälehti
 The National Library of Finland: Digitised issues of Päivälehti 

1889 establishments in Finland
1904 disestablishments in Finland
Defunct newspapers published in Finland
Finnish-language newspapers
Grand Duchy of Finland
Daily newspapers published in Finland
Newspapers established in 1889
Publications disestablished in 1904